Ralph Newton Shafer (March 17, 1894 – February 5, 1950) was a Major League Baseball pinch-runner. In 1 career game, he had no at-bats, only pinch-running. Shafer was born in Cincinnati, Ohio and died in Akron, Ohio. He attended the University of Cincinnati.

After his brief major league career, Shafer played several years of minor league baseball, where he played primarily outfielder.

References

External links

1894 births
1950 deaths
Pittsburgh Pirates players
Baseball players from Ohio
Cincinnati Bearcats baseball players
Huntington Blue Sox players
Lexington Colts players
Terre Haute Highlanders players
Kitchener Beavers players
Kitchener Terriers players
Paris Bourbonites players